Punjab Mail (Hindi: पंजाब मेल) is 1939 action adventure Hindi film directed by Homi Wadia for Wadia Movietone. The score was provided by Madhavlal Damodar Master, and stars Fearless Nadia, John Cawas, Sayani Atish, Sardar Mansoor, Boman Shroff and Sarita Devi. The film once again had Nadia playing the avenging female with mask and whip astride a horse dispensing justice and beating up the villains.

Cast
 Fearless Nadia
 John Cawas
 Sayani Atish
 Sarita Devi
 Boman Shroff
 Sardar Mansoor
 Master Chhotu
 Shahzadi
 Nazira
 Master Mohammed

Production
The Wadia brother films normally starred Boman Shroff in the Douglas Fairbanks Sr. style roles, but with Punjab Mail Boman Shroff was replaced by John Cawas as a leading man though Shroff continued to act in character roles for them. The action films Nadia starred in like Hunterwali (1935), Miss Frontier Mail (1936) and Punjab Mail (1939) had patriotic implications and showed her fighting against persecution and prejudice with all the films turning out to be box-office successes. The train "metaphor" likening the female protagonist to a speedy train and its "thrilling settings" was continually used in the Wadia Brothers films with titles like Toofan Mail (1932), Miss Frontier Mail (1936), Toofan Express (1938) and Punjab Mail` (1939).

Music
The music was directed by Madhavlal Damodar Master, with lyrics written by Pandit Gyan Chandra. The singers were Sarita Devi, Sardar Mansoor and Master Mohammed.

Song List

References

External links

1939 films
1930s Hindi-language films
Indian black-and-white films
Films directed by Homi Wadia
Indian action adventure films
1930s action adventure films
Hindi-language action adventure films